R. D. Bailey Lake is located on the Guyandotte River in Wyoming and Mingo Counties in West Virginia,  east of Justice. Originally referred to as Justice Reservoir, the lake was named by Congressional action, Public Law 90-46, on July 4, 1967 for Robert D. Bailey, Sr., a prominent jurist, diarist, and citizen of Pineville. R. D. Bailey lake was dedicated in August 1980.

The lake's remaining storage capacity is for flood control.

Photo gallery

References

Data furnished by the Department of the Army.

External links
R.D. Bailey Lake website

Reservoirs in West Virginia
Guyandotte River
Bodies of water of Mingo County, West Virginia
Bodies of water of Wyoming County, West Virginia
United States Army Corps of Engineers dams
Dams in West Virginia
Dams completed in 1980
IUCN Category V